Kəlfərəc (also, Kalfaradzh and Kel’farach) is a village in the Ismailli Rayon of Azerbaijan.  The village forms part of the municipality of Tağlabiyan.

References

External links 

Populated places in Ismayilli District